Alan IV may refer to:

 Alan IV, Duke of Brittany (died 1119)
 Alan IV, Viscount of Rohan (1166–1205)